Baltic Robinson: 2004 (also known as Jungle Star) was the fourth version of Expedition Robinson (known as Survivor in certain countries) to be filmed and aired in the Baltic region. The season aired from September, 2004 until December 18, 2004 and is based upon a format originally devised by the now-defunct British production company, Planet 24.

The central premise of the 2004 edition was the sole participation of celebrity contestants. Other changes that were made involved a filming period of 15 days (unlike the 30-day duration of preceding seasons) and the division of the contestants into two "tribes" through the use of a method known as a "schoolyard pick" (when team leaders interchangeably choose from a pool of people in order to form competing teams.)

Latvian finalist Dagmāra Legante (13 votes) eventually won the prize of €10 000, prevailing over the Lithuanian representative, Renata Ražnauskiene (7 votes), and the Estonian representative, Koit Toome (6 votes). Legante dominated in the competition stage of the season, earning five of her votes from the challenges. In comparison, Toome and Ražnauskiene earned two votes and one vote respectively during this phase of the competition.

Finishing order

References

External links
(Official Lithuanian Site Archive)
(Official Latvian Site Archive)

Baltic
Latvian television shows
Lithuanian television shows
Estonian television shows
2000s Estonian television series
2000s Latvian television series
2000s Lithuanian television series
2000s reality television series
2004 Estonian television seasons
2004 Latvian television seasons
2004 Lithuanian television seasons